Hikayeler Anlatıldı is the first album by the Turkish rock group Gripin, released in 2004 by GRGDN. It was later re-released as Hikayeler Anlatıldı 2 by Sony Music/GRGDN, containing a bonus cd with the acoustic versions of the songs.

Track listing
 "Boşver" (Don't care) – 4:26
 "Elalem" (Everybody) – 4:18
 "Karışmasın Kimseler" (Nobody should stand between us)- 5:23
 "Çok Kısa" (So short) – 3:23
 "Üç" (Three)– 3:57
 "Rüzgar" (Wind) – 4:19
 "Hayat Mars Etti" (Life won over) – 5:14
 "Yüzümden Düşen Bin Parça" (A thousand pieces falling off my face) - 3:59
 "Bir Anlık İstek" (Momentary need)– 4:16
 "Yenilmişiz" (We're done) – 2:23

References

External links
 Gripin official site 	 
 GRGDN 	 
 Sarki sozleri 
 . 

2004 albums
Gripin albums
Albums produced by Haluk Kurosman